

491001–491100 

|-bgcolor=#f2f2f2
| colspan=4 align=center | 
|}

491101–491200 

|-bgcolor=#f2f2f2
| colspan=4 align=center | 
|}

491201–491300 

|-bgcolor=#f2f2f2
| colspan=4 align=center | 
|}

491301–491400 

|-bgcolor=#f2f2f2
| colspan=4 align=center | 
|}

491401–491500 

|-bgcolor=#f2f2f2
| colspan=4 align=center | 
|}

491501–491600 

|-bgcolor=#f2f2f2
| colspan=4 align=center | 
|}

491601–491700 

|-bgcolor=#f2f2f2
| colspan=4 align=center | 
|}

491701–491800 

|-bgcolor=#f2f2f2
| colspan=4 align=center | 
|}

491801–491900 

|-bgcolor=#f2f2f2
| colspan=4 align=center | 
|}

491901–492000 

|-id=984
| 491984 Brunapontes ||  || Bruna Pontes (born 2006) is a student at Escola Municipal Morangaba in Campos dos Goytacazes, Brazil. She participates in the International Astronomical Search Collaboration, and has made many asteroid observations and discoveries. || 
|}

References 

491001-492000